The ETAP 23i is a Belgian trailerable sailboat that was designed by Jacques de Ridder as a cruiser and first built in 1982.

The ETAP 23i is a development of the ETAP 23. The design was developed into the ETAP 23iL in 1996.

Production
The design was built by ETAP Yachting in Belgium between 1982 and 1994, with 700 boats completed, but it is now out of production.

Design
The ETAP 23i is a recreational keelboat, built predominantly of glassfibre, with wood trim. It has a fractional sloop rig, a raked stem, a plumb transom, a transom-hung rudder controlled by a tiller and a lifting keel. It displaces  and carries  of ballast.

For sailing downwind the design may be equipped with a spinnaker.

Operational history
The boat was at one time supported by a class club, the ETAP Owners Association.

See also
List of sailing boat types

References

External links
Video tour of the ETAP 23i

Keelboats
1980s sailboat type designs
Sailing yachts
Trailer sailers
Sailboat type designs by Jacques De Ridder
Sailboat types built by ETAP Yachting